Oksana Chibisova (born 31 March 1977) is a Russian shot putter.

She competed at the 2005 World Championships without reaching the final round.

Her personal best throw is 18.62 metres, achieved in July 2005 in Tula.

External links

1977 births
Living people
Russian female shot putters
Place of birth missing (living people)
21st-century Russian women